Oenopota dubia is a species of sea snail, a marine gastropod mollusk in the family Mangeliidae.

Description

Distribution
This marine species occurs off Sakhalin, Eastern Russia

References

 Golikov, A. N., and O. A. Scarlato. "Shell-bearing gastropod and bivalve molluscs of the shelf of southern Sakhalin and their ecology." Biocenoses and fauna of the shelf of south Sakhalin. Issledovaniya Fauny Morei 30.38 (1985): 360–487.

External links
 

dubia
Gastropods described in 1985